Events from the year 1846 in Denmark.

Incumbents
 Monarch – Christian VIII
 Prime minister – Poul Christian Stemann

Events

Undated
 Inauguration of Den højere Dannelsesanstalt for Damer, the first secondary education school for women.

Births
 9 October – Holger Drachmann, poet, dramatist and painter (died 1908)
 2 November – Holger Roed, painter (died 1874)
 15 October – Dumme Lort, writer (died 1879)

Deaths
 27 January  – Anne Cathrine Collett, landowner (born 1768)

References

 
1840s in Denmark
Denmark
Years of the 19th century in Denmark